Morimakan Koïta is a Malian professional footballer, who plays as a midfielder for Sriwijaya FC.

Club career 
On November 23, 2014, it was reported that he already signed with Indonesian-side Sriwijaya FC.

International career 
In January 2014, coach Djibril Dramé, invited him to be a part of the Mali squad for the 2014 African Nations Championship. He helped the team to the quarter finals where they lost to Zimbabwe by two goals to one.

Honours 
2003-2004 : Finalist U-15 Championship of Mali
2012-2013 : Finalist U-16 Championship of Mali
2013      : Finalist U-23 Championship of Mali

Champion of Mali 2012 with Stade Mali
Champion of Mali 2013 with Stade Mali
Champion of Mali 2014 with Stade Mali

External links

References

Living people
Mali international footballers
Malian footballers
2014 African Nations Championship players
1990 births
Stade Malien players
Sriwijaya F.C. players
Malian expatriate footballers
Malian expatriate sportspeople in Indonesia
Expatriate footballers in Indonesia
Liga 1 (Indonesia) players
Sportspeople from Bamako
Association football midfielders
21st-century Malian people
Mali A' international footballers